Sir George Farwell  (22 December 1845 – 30 September 1915) was an English judge, noted for trying the Taff Vale case at the first instance.

Biography
Farwell was born in Codsall, Staffordshire, the second son of Frederick Cooper Farwell, agent to the Duke of Cleveland, and of Louisa Whitbread, née Michell, daughter of Admiral Sir Frederick Michell. He was educated at Rugby School and Balliol College, Oxford, where he took first class honours in classical moderations and second class honours in literae humaniores.

He was called to the bar in 1871. In 1891 he became a QC and in 1895 a bencher of Lincoln's Inn, while in 1899 he was raised to the bench. In 1900 he came into prominence over the case known as the Taff Vale judgment. His decision, though reversed by the court of appeal, was upheld in 1901 by the House of Lords, and ultimately led to the passing of the Trade Disputes Act (1906). In 1906 Farwell was made a Lord of Appeal, but resigned this position in 1913. He published Concise Treatise on the Law of Powers (1874).

His son Sir Christopher John Wickens Farwell was also a High Court Chancery judge.

Notable Cases
Whittington v Seale-Hayne (1900) 82 LT 49
Borland’s Trustee v Steel Brothers & Co Ltd [1901] 1 Ch 279

Arms

Notes

References

1845 births
1915 deaths
People educated at Rugby School
Alumni of Balliol College, Oxford
Lords Justices of Appeal
Members of Lincoln's Inn
20th-century English judges
Members of the Privy Council of the United Kingdom
Knights Bachelor
English King's Counsel
People from Codsall
Members of the Judicial Committee of the Privy Council
English barristers
19th-century English lawyers